The  is an electric multiple unit (EMU) train type operated by the private railway operator Nankai Electric Railway in Japan since 1985.

Operations
The 9000 series is used on Nankai Line commuter services singly or coupled with 12000 series EMUs on Southern Premium limited express services to provide non-reserved accommodation.

Formations
, the fleet consists of five four-car sets (9501 to 9509) and two six-car sets (9511 and 9513), formed as follows.

4-car sets

 The "M1" car is fitted with two scissors-type pantographs.
 The "M2" car is designated as a "mildly air-conditioned" car.

6-car sets

 The "M1" cars are fitted with two scissors-type pantographs.
 The middle "M2" car is designated as a "mildly air-conditioned" car.

History
The first sets entered service in 1985.

References

External links

 Nankai rolling stock information 

Electric multiple units of Japan
Train-related introductions in 1985
Nankai Electric Railway rolling stock
1500 V DC multiple units of Japan
Tokyu Car multiple units